Dobrosloveni is a commune in Olt County, Oltenia, Romania. It is composed of five villages: Dobrosloveni, Frăsinetu, Potopinu, Reșca and Reșcuța.

According to the 2002 census, it had a population of 3,909, of which 99% were ethnic Romanians. The commune's village of Reşca contains remains of an ancient Roman municipium, named Romula or Malva.

References

Communes in Olt County
Localities in Oltenia